Arızlar is a Turkish place name that may refer to the following places in Turkey:

 Arızlar, Göynük, a village in the district of Göynük, Bolu Province
 Arızlar, Sandıklı, a village in the district of Sandıklı, Afyonkarahisar Province